Dance Classics of Chaka Khan is a compilation album of recordings by American R&B/funk singer Chaka Khan released on the Warner Bros. Records label in Japan in 1999.

As the title suggests the compilation mainly focuses on the dancefloor friendly part of Khan's repertoire from the late 1970s to mid 1980s, including classic single cuts like "I'm Every Woman", "Fate", "Eye To Eye", "Clouds", "I Feel for You" as well as album tracks like "Pass It On (Sure Thing)" and "A Woman in a Man's World".

Dance Classics is however mainly notable for the inclusion of two rarities: the original 12" Long Vocal Mix and 12" Instrumental Version of the 1982 hit single "Tearin' It Up", both mixed by legendary D.J. Larry Levan and as yet only available on this compilation. The original version of "Tearin' It Up" appears on the eponymous Chaka Khan album which incidentally also remains unreleased on CD in both the United States and Europe.

The Dance Classics of Chaka Khan set also features both the original 1978 version and the 1989 remix of "I'm Every Woman" (from Life is a Dance - The Remix Project) and concludes with the 1984 ballad "Through the Fire"

Track listing

"Tearin' It Up" (Long Vocal Mix) (Lumibao, Sigler) - 7:23
 Original version appears on 1982 album  Chaka Khan
"I'm Every Woman" (Ashford, Simpson) - 4:06
 From 1978 album  Chaka
"Pass It On (A Sure Thing)" (Maiden, Washburn) - 5:03
 Original version appears on 1982 album  Chaka Khan
"Clouds" (Ashford, Simpson)  4:26
 From 1980 album  Naughty
"Fate" (Bugatti, Musker) - 3:15
 From 1981 album  What Cha' Gonna Do For Me
"Eye to Eye"  (Freeman, Sembello, Sembello, Sembello) - 4:39
 From 1984 album  I Feel for You
"I Feel for You"  Prince  5:45
 From 1984 album  I Feel for You
"A Woman in a Man's World" (Kastner, McNally) - 3:58
 From 1978 album  Chaka
"What Cha' Gonna Do for Me" (Doheny, Stuart) - 3:53
 From 1981 album  What Cha' Gonna Do For Me
"I Know You, I Live You" (Khan, Mardin) - 4:29
 From 1981 album  What Cha' Gonna Do For Me
"I'm Every Woman" (Remix Version By Dancin' Danny D.) (Ashford, Simpson) - 8:21
 From 1989 compilation Life is a Dance - The Remix Project. Original version appears on 1978 album  Chaka
"Tearin' It Up" (Instrumental) (Lumibao, Sigler) - 8:08
 Original version appears on 1982 album  Chaka Khan
"Through the Fire" (Foster, Keane, Weil) - 4:45
 From 1984 album  I Feel for You

Personnel 

Michel Comte – Photography
David Foster – Producer
Larry Levan – Remixing
Arif Mardin – Producer
Russ Titelman – Producer
Glenn Wexler – Cover Photo

Chaka Khan compilation albums
1999 compilation albums
Warner Records compilation albums